The Hedden's Grove Historic District is a national historic district located at New Albany, Indiana.  The district encompasses 43 contributing buildings and 2 contributing structures in a suburban residential section of New Albany.  It developed between the 1920s and 1950s, and includes notable examples of Colonial Revival, Tudor Revival, Bungalow / American Craftsman, and Ranch style residential architecture.

It was listed on the National Register of Historic Places in 2010.

References

Historic districts in New Albany, Indiana
Historic districts on the National Register of Historic Places in Indiana
Colonial Revival architecture in Indiana
Tudor Revival architecture in Indiana
National Register of Historic Places in Floyd County, Indiana